Larry Jones is a retired American basketball player. He was the ECAC North Player of the Year as a senior in 1987–88 while playing for Boston University. That season he led the Terriers to a second-place finish in the regular season conference standings as well as capturing the ECAC North tournament championship. Jones led BU to the 1988 NCAA tournament where they would lose to Duke in the first round. In three seasons, Jones finished with 1,130 points, which was 10th in school history at the time of his graduation.

References

Living people
Year of birth uncertain
Boston University Terriers men's basketball players
Power forwards (basketball)
American men's basketball players
Year of birth missing (living people)